The 7.65×53mm Mauser (designated as the 7,65 × 53 Arg. by the C.I.P.) is a first-generation smokeless powder rimless bottlenecked rifle cartridge developed for use in the Mauser Model 1889 rifle by Paul Mauser of the Mauser company. It is also known as 7.65×53mm Argentine, 7.65×53mm Argentine rimless, 7.65mm Argentine, 7.65×53mm Belgian Mauser or 7.65mm Belgian (in the United States) and 7.65×53mm Mauser (in Belgium).

Ballistically it is comparable to the .303 British cartridge.

History
The 7.65×53mm Mauser was the result of considerable experimentation by Paul Mauser to optimize the bullet diameter for use with the new smokeless propellant introduced as Poudre B in the 1886 pattern 8mm Lebel that started a military rifle ammunition revolution. At the time of its development it was a high-performance smokeless-powder cartridge. Judging by the dimensions of the casing, it was developed from the earlier Patrone 88 adopted into German service.

This cartridge was loaded commercially by many manufacturers in the United States until about 1936. Hornady is the only major U.S. ammunition manufacturer to still produce this cartridge. Sporting ammunition in this caliber is still loaded in Europe. Norma, Prvi Partizan, and Fabricaciones Militares (FM) currently produce 7.65×53mm ammunition. Cases are easily formed from .30-06 brass; just resize and trim. For charging the cartridge, use .303 British load data.

Cartridge dimensions
The 7.65×53mm Mauser has 3.70 ml (57.1 grains H2O) cartridge case capacity.
The exterior shape of the case was designed to promote reliable case feeding and extraction in bolt-action rifles and machine guns alike, under extreme conditions.

7.65×53mm Mauser maximum C.I.P. cartridge dimensions. All sizes in millimeters (mm).

Americans would define the shoulder angle at alpha/2 ≈ 22.2 degrees. The common rifling twist rate for this cartridge is 280 mm (1 in 11.02 in); although 250 mm (1 in 9.84 in) was also used, see below, 4 grooves, Ø lands = 7.65 mm, Ø grooves = 7.92 mm, land width = 4.20 mm and the primer type is large rifle.

According to the official Commission Internationale Permanente pour l'Epreuve des Armes à Feu Portatives (CIP) rulings the 7.65×53mm Mauser can handle up to  Pmax piezo pressure. In CIP member countries every rifle cartridge combination has to be proofed at 125% of this maximum pressure to certify fit for sale to consumers.
This means that 7.65×53mm Mauser chambered arms in CIP regulated countries are currently (2013) proof tested at  PE piezo pressure.

The American .308 Winchester cartridge is a close ballistic twin of the 7.65×53mm Mauser. The .308 Winchester being a post World War II cartridge developed by Winchester to provide similar performance in a short bolt action format.

Due to the cartridge case's dimensions, production of 7.65mm brass can be accomplished by reforming .30-06 Springfield cases.

Military ammunition

Reverse engineering the trajectory from the previous sentence indicates a ballistic coefficient (G1 BC) of approximately 0.34.

Besides a pointed nose this projectile also had a boat tail to further reduce drag. Reverse engineering the trajectory from the previous sentence indicates a ballistic coefficient (G1 BC) of approximately 0.55.

Military use

Users
At one time, the 7.65×53mm Mauser cartridge saw widespread military use. It was used by:

Firearms chambered in 7.65×53mm
Model 1871
Model 1889
Model 1890
Model 1891 The original rifling twist rate of Argentinian Mauser 1891 rifles was 250 mm (1 in 9.84 in).
Model 1893
Model 1903
Model 1905
Model 1907
Model 1909
Model 1927
FN Model 1930
Vz. 32
Standardmodell 1933
FN Model 1935. 
Fittipaldi machine gun
Madsen machine gun
Vickers-Berthier Mk.I machine gun
Maxim MG08 machine gun
Chauchat Light machine gun
FN Mle1930 / D machine gun
CZ Brno ZB-26 machine gun
CZ Brno ZB-30 machine gun
FN Model 1949 semi-automatic rifle.

References

Citations

Bibliography

External links

 The 7.65x53 and 7.65x53R page, by Chuck Hawks (accessed 2015-03-14)

 
Pistol and rifle cartridges
Military cartridges
Military equipment of Argentina
Weapons and ammunition introduced in 1889